Strmec is a dispersed settlement northeast of Luče in Slovenia. The area belongs to the traditional region of Styria and is now included in the Savinja Statistical Region.

References

External links

Strmec on Geopedia

Populated places in the Municipality of Luče